This is a list of colleges and universities in Ponce, Puerto Rico. Both, public and private colleges and universities are listed. General as well as specialized institutions of higher education are included.

Universities and colleges list summary table
The following table lists colleges and universities by their name.  A listing sorted by any of the other fields can be obtained by clicking on the header of the field. For example, clicking on "Barrio" will sort colleges and universities by their barrio location.

Key:
C. = Calle (street)
NB = Northbound
SB = Southbound
WB = Westbound
EB = Eastbound
Unk = Unknown
N/A = Not applicable

Notes

References

External links

 Universidad Ana G. Mendez in Ponce, Puerto Rico

Universities and colleges in Ponce, Puerto Rico
universities